Specific detectivity, or D*, for a photodetector is a figure of merit used to characterize performance, equal to the reciprocal of noise-equivalent power (NEP), normalized per square root of the sensor's area and frequency bandwidth (reciprocal of twice the integration time).

It is commonly expressed in Jones units in honor of Robert Clark Jones who originally defined it.

It is often useful to express the specific detectivity in terms of relative noise levels present in the device. A common expression is given below.

Detectivity measurement
Detectivity can be measured from a suitable optical setup using known parameters.
You will need a known light source with known irradiance at a given standoff distance. The incoming light source will be chopped at a certain frequency, and then each wavelength will be integrated over a given time constant over a given number of frames.

In detail, we compute the bandwidth  directly from the integration time constant .

Next, an average signal and rms noise needs to be measured from a set of  frames. This is done either directly by the instrument, or done as post-processing.

Now, the computation of the radiance  in W/sr/cm² must be computed where cm² is the emitting area. Next, emitting area must be converted into a projected area and the solid angle; this product is often called the etendue. This step can be obviated by the use of a calibrated source, where the exact number of photons/s/cm² is known at the detector. If this is unknown, it can be estimated using the black-body radiation equation, detector active area  and the etendue. This ultimately converts the outgoing radiance of the black body in W/sr/cm² of emitting area into one of W observed on the detector.

The broad-band responsivity, is then just the signal weighted by this wattage.

Where,
  is the responsivity in units of Signal / W, (or sometimes V/W or A/W)
  is the outgoing radiance from the black body (or light source) in W/sr/cm² of emitting area
  is the total integrated etendue between the emitting source and detector surface
  is the detector area
  is the solid angle of the source projected along the line connecting it to the detector surface.

From this metric noise-equivalent power can be computed by taking the noise level over the responsivity.

Similarly, noise-equivalent irradiance can be computed using the responsivity in units of photons/s/W instead of in units of the signal.
Now, the detectivity is simply the noise-equivalent power normalized to the bandwidth and detector area.

References 

Physical quantities
Infrared imaging